Nana is a surname. Notable people with the surname include

 Abrewa Nana (born 1980), Ghanaian singer, songwriter, dancer and former Idol series judge
 Antoinette Nana Djimou Ida (born 1985), French-Cameroonian heptathlete
 Daniel Nana Yeboah (born 1978), Ghanaian football player
 Harding Nana (born 1981), Cameroonian basketball player 
 Karl Te Nana (born 1975), New Zealand rugby player
 Kojo Nana Obiri-Yeboah, prominent Pentecostal pastor from Ghana active primarily in Uganda
 Lek Nana (born c. 1936), Thai businessman and politician
 Mizaistom Nana, a fictional character in the manga series Hunter × Hunter
 Parbhu Nana (born 1933), East African cricketer
 Prince Nana (born 1977), American professional wrestler of Ghanaian extraction
 Prince Nana (footballer) (born 1981), Danish-Ghanaian football player

See also

Nina (name)